British church may refer to:

Christian denomination 
 Celtic Christianity
 Christianity in the United Kingdom
 Church of England
 Christianity in Ireland
 Ancient British Church, a former denomination, allegedly created in the 19th century
Catholicate of the West, also called Orthodox Church of the British Isles
 British Orthodox Church
Ancient British Church in North America

Building 
Church architecture in England
English church monuments
Church architecture in Scotland

See also 
Neo-Celtic Christianity
Celtic Rite
Celtic mass
Religion in the United Kingdom
Religion in Ireland
English church (disambiguation)
Irish church (disambiguation)
Scottish church (disambiguation)